Yunnanilus caohaiensis is a species of ray-finned fish, a stone loach, in the genus Yunnanilus. Its type locality is Caohai Lake, Weining County in Guizhou, China.

References

C
Taxa named by Ding Rui-Hua
Fish described in 1992